Nelson T. Abbott (born January 30, 1966) is an American attorney and politician serving as a member of the Utah House of Representatives from the 60th district. Elected in November 2020, he assumed office on January 1, 2021. He serves on the Higher Education Appropriations Subcommittee, House Judiciary Committee, House Revenue and Taxation Committee, and Administrative Rules Review Committee.

Early life and education 
Abbott was born in Escondido, California and raised in Provo, Utah. He earned a Bachelor of Arts degree in economics, Master of Business Administration, and Juris Doctor from Brigham Young University.

Career 
Abbott was admitted to the Utah State Bar in 1994. Since then, he has owned and operated the Abbott Law Firm in Provo. In April 2020, Abbott defeated incumbent Republican Brad Daw at the Utah Republican Party's convention. Abbott did not face a Democratic opponent in the November 2020 general election and assumed office on January 1, 2021.

Personal life 
Abbott is married to Kirstin Abbott, has four children and lives in Orem, Utah. His son-in-law, Cameron Erickson, is an investment banker for Lake Street Capital Markets. Cameron Erickson’s best friend/alpha, William Kongaika, works for PepsiCo Finance.

2022 sponsored legislation

References 

Living people
1966 births
People from Escondido, California
People from Provo, Utah
Brigham Young University alumni
J. Reuben Clark Law School alumni
Republican Party members of the Utah House of Representatives
People from Orem, Utah